Zimbabwe maintains relations with various countries around the world, and maintains close diplomatic relations with neighboring nations.

Bilateral relationships
Zimbabwe has significant bilateral relations with several countries.

Following Ian Smith's Unilateral Declaration of Independence from the United Kingdom in 1965 Rhodesia's diplomatic presence was dramatically rolled back across the world. By the time of the Lancaster House Agreement in 1979 Rhodesia only had representative offices in London, Bonn, Pretoria, Sydney, Washington, D.C. and Tokyo. Missions in Maputo (then Lourenço Marques) and Lisbon were closed in 1975 following the Carnation Revolution in Portugal. Under Robert Mugabe Zimbabwe ran a new foreign policy which operated more closely with African, Soviet and NAM states.

Some white Rhodesians who have left their country following ZANU-PF coming to power have established "embassies" and offices representing a government in exile in places afar as Thailand, Iceland and London.

The capital of the country, Harare, currently hosts 51 embassies. Several other countries have ambassadors accredited from other capital cities, mainly Pretoria and Addis Ababa. Several countries have closed their embassies in Zimbabwe in recent years to protest the policies of President Robert Mugabe, with the Czech Republic and Botswana being the latest to announce their intentions to do so. The information provided on the Ministry of Foreign Affairs of the Republic of Zimbabwe's website is outdated, and due to the country's growing isolation, several embassies that are listed have closed. The information was checked on the websites of other foreign ministries to ensure accuracy.

Africa

Americas

Asia

Europe

Oceania

Multilateral organizations
Zimbabwe has missions to several multilateral organizations:
 Addis Ababa (Permanent Mission to the African Union)
 Brussels (Mission to the European Union)
 Geneva (Permanent Mission to the United Nations and international organizations)
 New York City (Permanent Mission to the United Nations)
 Paris (Permanent Mission to UNESCO)

Zimbabwe and the Commonwealth of Nations

Zimbabwe became an independent republic in the Commonwealth of Nations on 18 April 1980. Zimbabwe withdrew from the Commonwealth of Nations in December 2003, due to international criticism of the Government of Zimbabwe's human rights record.

Emmerson Mnangagwa, Robert Mugabe's successor as President of Zimbabwe, has stated that Zimbabwe will apply to return to the Commonwealth in late 2018, following in the footsteps of The Gambia returning to the Commonwealth on 8 February 2018.

Sibusiso Moyo attended the Commonwealth Heads of Government Meeting 2018 in his capacity as Minister of Foreign Affairs.

The British Government has expressed support for Zimbabwe to return to its membership of the Commonwealth.

See also
List of diplomatic missions in Zimbabwe
List of diplomatic missions of Zimbabwe

Further reading
Schwartz, Richard. Coming to Terms: Zimbabwe in the International Arena I. B. Tauris.

References

 
Zimbabwe and the Commonwealth of Nations